Jack Curtis Dubowsky is an American composer and author who has composed music for film, chorus, and concert performance.  His music has been performed by the San Francisco Choral Artists, the Lesbian/Gay Chorus of San Francisco, the Snopea Chamber Ensemble, the Organic Sound Experiment, and others. He has received grants from Meet the Composer (1998), the Zellerbach Family Fund (1997), and the Friends of the San Francisco Public Library (1997), and a "Special Recognition of a Score" jury award from the Fire Island Gay and Lesbian Film Festival (2002) for his work on the film Under One Roof.  Dubowsky works through his music house, De Stijl Music.

He has a BA in Communication from UCLA and a Master of Music degree in Composition from the San Francisco Conservatory of Music.

Books
 Intersecting Film, Music, and Queerness (2016)
 Easy Listening and Film Scoring 1948-78 (2021)

Discography
 Diazepam Nights (1989)
 Helot Revolt (1992)
 Robbie D - The Fertile Boy (1993) - (guitar)
 That Man: Peter Berlin OST (2005)
 Rock Haven OST (2007)
 Redwoods OST (2009)
 I Always Said Yes OST (2013)
 Steven Arnold: Heavenly Bodies OST (2019)
 Bolsa Chica Calm (2022)

Concert Works
 Eisenhower Farewell Address (2008)
 Halloween in the Castro (Opera) (2009)

References

External links
 De Stijl Music - composer's web site
  Interview with Jack Curtis Dubowsky (The Daily Film Music Blog)
  - Musical Publications on Sheet Music Plus
  - Musical Publications on Theodore Front Musical Literature
  - Musical Publications, library holdings, cataloged by Worldcat
 

American male composers
21st-century American composers
San Francisco Conservatory of Music alumni
Living people
21st-century American male musicians
Year of birth missing (living people)